Ijele the Traveler is the fifth studio album by Nigerian musician Flavour N'abania. The album was released on June 30, 2017, and artists like Sarkodie, Zoro, Terry Apala, Phyno, Semah G. Weifur and Chidinma are featured on some of the tracks. The record producers who worked on the project include Masterkraft, Tekno, Young John, Del'B, Illkeyz and Kezykleff.

Background
Ijele the Traveler follows his studio album titled Thankful released in 2014. Igbo masquerade culture, with its Ijele Masquerade, significantly influences the album. The album is composed of contemporary highlife and a blend of afro pop, hip hop, reggae and R&B sounds. The songs on the album were written in Igbo, English, and Pidgin. The song "Most High" features Semah Weifur, a blind Liberian boy who always wanted to meet Flavour.

Track listing

References

2017 albums
Flavour N'abania albums
Albums produced by Tekno